Funky Head Boxers is a video game developed and published by Sega for the arcade and Sega Saturn.

Gameplay
Funky Head Boxers is a boxing game where the boxers have large, boxed-shaped heads.

Boxers
The game features six boxers from four countries:
Billy Johnson, from The United States of America,
Kouji Haneda, from Japan,
Joseph Davidson, from The United States of America,
Lightnin' Baron III, from The United Kingdom,
Jose Alvarez, from Mexico,
Jack White Jr., from The United States of America

Reception
Next Generation reviewed the arcade version of the game, rating it two stars out of five, and stated: "Funky Head Boxers is one bizarro title. It's a decent game but not impressive, especially for what's hyped as a hot, new arcade system."

References

External links 
 Funky Head Boxers at GameFAQs
 Funky Head Boxers at Giant Bomb
 Funky Head Boxers at Killer List of Videogames

1995 video games
Arcade video games
Boxing video games
Sega arcade games
Sega Saturn games
Video games developed in Japan